Caenurgia togataria  is a species of moth of the family Erebidae. It is found in the southern parts of the United States (including California), south to Mexico.

The wingspan is about 37 mm.

References

External links

Moths described in 1862
Caenurgia